Krasnapolle, also spelled Krasnapollie, is an urban-type settlement and the center of Krasnapolle District, in the Mogilev Region of Belarus.

Geography

Notable people
George Pusenkoff, artist and photographer

References

Urban-type settlements in Belarus
Populated places in Mogilev Region